Emmett Mathias Joseph Johns  (April 3, 1928 – January 13, 2018), was a Canadian priest and humanitarian. He was the founder of Dans la Rue (originally known as Le Bon Dieu Dans La Rue), a homeless shelter and support group for street youth in Montreal, Quebec.

Life and career 

Emmett Johns, who was of Irish descent, was born in 1928 in the Plateau Mont-Royal neighbourhood of Montreal.

He graduated with a BA from Loyola College in 1974.

He served as a Catholic priest and vicar at Saint John Fischer Parish in Pointe-Claire, Our Lady of Fatima in Saint-Laurent as well as a pastor at Bishop Whelan High School in Lachine and as a hospital chaplain.

In December 1988, Johns founded Le Bon Dieu Dans la Rue. With a $10,000 loan, he purchased a used motorhome and took to the streets at night, distributing food and basic goods to street youth, and giving them a place to warm up.

Over time, the organization grew to include both a night shelter in 1993 and day centre in 1997, always based on the "help without judgement" philosophy of its founder.

Its name was eventually changed to Dans La Rue, to avoid a religious connotation, and continued to offer food, shelter and friendship to homeless youths, as well as the resources and services required to help them get off the street.

In 2005, he was a member of the Quebec delegation which attended the funeral of Pope John Paul II.

In 2016, Johns retired from active involvement in Dans la Rue due to suffering from Parkinson's disease.

Death
He died peacefully in a retirement home in Montreal on January 13, 2018, aged 89.

Recognition and Awards
2016
• Commander – Ordre de Montréal

2013
• Honorary Member – Ordre des travailleurs sociaux et thérapeutes conjugaux et familiaux du Québec

2012
• Recipient : Queen Elizabeth II Diamond Jubilee Medal

2011
• Recipient : Contribution to Humanity Award – Montreal Intercultural Dialogue institute
• Special concert in his honor by the MSO
• Montrealer closest to sainthood – Montreal Mirror ”Best of Montreal readers’ poll”
• Recipient : Prix de la tolérance Paul Gérin-Lajoie – Fondation de la tolérance Paul Gérin-Lajoie

2010
• Montrealer closest to sainthood – Montreal Mirror ”Best of Montreal readers’ poll”

2009
• Montrealer closest to sainthood – Montreal Mirror ”Best of Montreal readers’ poll”
• Most trusted public personality – Magazine Sélection Reader’s Digest

2008
• Biography published “Appelez-moi Pops”
• Martin Luther King Jr. Legacy Award

2006
• Documentary film on Pop’s life called “Notre Père” launched
• Certificate Honorary Member – Canadian Pediatric Society

2005
• Honorary Doctorate Honoris Causea – Saint Paul University

2004
• Recipient – Reader’s Digest Hero of the Year award
• Carrier of the Olympic Flame

2003
• Honorary Doctorate Honoris Causea – McGill University
• Recipient – Medal of the University of Montreal
• Grand Officer – National Order of Quebec
• Honorary certificate – HEC Montreal / Commerce Magazine
• Prix de la Santé et du Bien-être social – Ordre des psychologues du Québec
• Honorary Doctorate Degree – Université du Québec à Montréal

2002
• Golden Jubilee Medal – Canadian Governers General
• Simon McDonaugh Humanitarian Award – United Irish Societies of Montreal
• Bishop Crowley Award – English Catholic Council
• Great Montrealer – The Academy of Great Montrealers

2001
• The Rights and Freedoms Prize – Commission des Droits de la personne et des droits à la jeunesse

2000
• Communications & Leadership Award from Toastmasters International

1999
• Award of excellence – Montreal Urban Police
• Annual Desjardins Prize
• Member to the Order of Canada

1998
• Humanitarian Award – The Association of Quebec Psychiatrists
• Anne Greenup Citizenship Award

1997
• Honorary Doctorate Degree – Concordia University
• 12th Honor Roll of Excellence – Maclean’s magazine

References

1928 births
2018 deaths
Quebec people of Irish descent
People from Le Plateau-Mont-Royal
Anglophone Quebec people
20th-century Canadian Roman Catholic priests
Canadian humanitarians
Grand Officers of the National Order of Quebec
Members of the Order of Canada
Clergy from Montreal
Neurological disease deaths in Quebec
Deaths from Parkinson's disease
Loyola College (Montreal) alumni
21st-century Canadian Roman Catholic priests